Tafari Lalibela Moore (born 5 July 1997) is an English professional footballer who plays as a defender for St Albans City. He came through the youth system at Arsenal, and has been involved with the England national under-20 football team.

Club career

Arsenal
Moore was born in the London Borough of Brent. He joined Queens Park Rangers as an under-nine, and moved on to Arsenal at the age of twelve. Moore signed his first professional contract with Arsenal on 5 July 2014, his 17th birthday. He was a member of Arsenal's under-21 team that beat Aston Villa in the 2015–16 Professional U21 Development League play-off final to gain promotion to the top division.

Loans
On 17 August 2016, he was sent on a season-long loan to Eredivisie club FC Utrecht. Five days later he made his professional debut for Jong FC Utrecht in the Eerste Divisie. Moore played in his first match for the senior team on 16 September in a 5–1 defeat at home to Groningen.

On 12 January 2018, he was sent on loan to League Two club Wycombe Wanderers until the end of the 2017–18 season. At the end of the season, he was released by the Gunners.

Plymouth Argyle
On 28 June 2018, he joined Plymouth Argyle. Moore started games early in the season but produced some disappointing performances and did not play again in the 2018–19 season after November. Moore played twice in cup games at the start of the following season before being listed for loan in October. On 9 January 2020, it was announced that the Pilgrims had offered Moore a settlement to terminate his contract. Later that month, he joined Colchester United on loan until the end of the season, but only made one appearance. Moore was released by Plymouth at the end of the season. In October 2020 he played for Salford City's development team in The Central League.

Non-league
Moore joined Hendon in September 2021.

In June 2022, Moore made the step up to join National League South club St Albans City. Moore was awarded the National League South Player of the Month award for November 2022.

International career
Moore was born to a Jamaican father, and a Jamaican-Barbadian mother. He has played a youth international for England, and was an instrumental member of the English side that won the 2014 UEFA European Under-17 Championship. As so he was also named in UEFA's team of the tournament. On 20 July 2016, he was called up to the England Under-19 squad for the 2016 UEFA European Under-19 Championship in Germany. 
England eventually got to the semifinals of the Euros, where they went out by 2–1 to Italy.

Honours
Arsenal
Professional Development League:  U21s Playoff Winner-2016

England
UEFA European Under-17 Championship: 2014
UEFA European Under-19 Championship: 2016 Semifinalist

Individual
2014 UEFA European Under-17 Championship: Team of the Tournament
National League South Player of the Month: November 2022

Career statistics

Personal life
Moore is a devout Rastafarian who often credits God in interviews and has large dreadlocks in the custom of his faith.

References

External links
England profile at The FA

1997 births
Living people
Footballers from Kilburn, London
English footballers
English expatriate footballers
English expatriate sportspeople in the Netherlands
Expatriate footballers in the Netherlands
England youth international footballers
Association football defenders
Arsenal F.C. players
Jong FC Utrecht players
FC Utrecht players
Wycombe Wanderers F.C. players
Plymouth Argyle F.C. players
Colchester United F.C. players
Hendon F.C. players
St Albans City F.C. players
English Football League players
Eerste Divisie players
Eredivisie players
Southern Football League players
National League (English football) players
Black British sportspeople
English people of Jamaican descent
English people of Barbadian descent
English Rastafarians